Harry Elie Rochon (July 21, 1882 – April 22, 1921) was a Canadian professional ice hockey player. He played with the Quebec Bulldogs of the National Hockey Association.

He was a brother of hockey player Joel Rochon.

References

1882 births
1921 deaths
Canadian ice hockey goaltenders
Ice hockey people from Quebec
Quebec Bulldogs (NHA) players